Worship Again is Michael W. Smith's seventeenth album. This is Smith's second album of worship music. The bulk of the album was recorded on July 19, 2002 at Southeast Christian Church in Middletown, Kentucky before a live audience. The album won Smith his third Grammy Award for Best Pop/Contemporary Gospel Album at the 46th Annual Grammy Awards.

Track listing

Music video 

The video for "There She Stands", is a tribute to the people who suffered in the September 11 attacks.

Personnel 
Live set

 Michael W. Smith – lead vocals, acoustic piano
 David Hamilton – keyboards, music director
 Jim Daneker – keyboards, Hammond B3 organ
 Glenn Pearce – electric guitars
 Sarah McIntosh – acoustic guitar, backing vocals, lead vocal (verse 2 on "Lord Have Mercy")
 Brent Milligan – bass, cello
 Raymond Boyd – drums, percussion
 David Davidson – violin, viola
 Skip Cleavinger – Irish flutes, pipes
 Carissima Joseph – backing vocals 
 Kristee Mays – backing vocals 
 Calvin Nowell – backing vocals 
 Tiffany Palmer – backing vocals 
 Daniel Palmore – backing vocals 
 Leanne Palmore –  backing vocals 

Studio cuts (tracks 12–14)

 Michael W. Smith – lead vocals, acoustic piano, keyboards, Hammond B3 organ, acoustic guitars
 Jim Daneker – programming (12, 14)
 Glenn Pearce – electric guitars
 Matt Pierson – bass 
 Raymond Boyd – drums
 The Nashville String Machine – orchestra
 Carl Gorodetzky – contractor
 David Hamilton – string arrangements and conductor
 Amy Grant – lead vocal on verse 2 of "Lord Have Mercy"
 Carissima Joseph – backing vocals 
 Kristee Mays – backing vocals 
 Calvin Nowell – backing vocals 
 Leanne Palmore – backing vocals 
 Jerard Woods – backing vocals 
 Jovaun Woods – backing vocals

Production

 Michael W. Smith – producer
 Eric Elwell – event producer
 Joey Ciccoline – event manager
 Shane Hamill – production manager, monitor engineer
 Beverly Bartsch – production assistant
 Josh Fieldhouse – lighting and set design
 Sean O'Rourke – keyboard technician
 Jan Schneider – drum technician
 Dave Graef – guitar technician
 Jeff Murray – audio technician
 Tommy Rodgers – front of house mix engineer
 Ronnie Brookshire – recording engineer, orchestra recording engineer at Masterfonics Tracking Room, Nashville, Tennessee, mixing at "The Groove Room", Soundstage Studios, Nashville, Tennessee
 Joel Singer – recording engineer
 Rob Burrell – recording engineer, editing,
 "There She Stands" recorded at Deer Valley Studios, Franklin, Tennessee, and Masterfonics Tracking Room, Nashville, Tennessee
 Hank Williams – mastering at MasterMix, Nashville, Tennessee
 Jason McArthur – A&R coordination
 Scott Hughes – art direction
 Laurie Melick – label production coordination
 Arnholt - Fox – graphic design
 Russ Harrington – photography 
 Glen Rose – photography
 Jimmy Abegg – cover illustration
 Stephanie McBrayer – creative director, stylist
 Carol Maxwell – hair, make-up

Charts

Weekly charts

Year-end charts

References 

2002 live albums
Michael W. Smith live albums
Grammy Award for Best Pop/Contemporary Gospel Album
Reunion Records albums
Middletown, Kentucky